Lorillard may refer to:

Places
Lorillard Place, a street in the Belmont section of the Bronx, located between Fordham Road and St Barnabas Hospital, named for brothers George L. Lorillard and Pierre Lorillard IV
Lorillard River, a river in the Nunavut territory of Canada
Ville Lorillard (Lorillard City) or Yaxchilan, an ancient Mayan city

People with the name
Elaine Lorillard (1914-2007), American socialite and co-founder of the Newport Jazz Festival and the Newport Folk Festival with her then-husband Louis Livingston Lorillard
Louis Livingston Lorillard (1919–1986), co-founder of the Newport Jazz Festival and the Newport Folk Festival with his then-wife Elaine Guthrie Lorillard, and a descendant of Pierre Abraham Lorillard
Pierre Abraham Lorillard (1742-1776), American founder of P. Lorillard and Company, which developed into the Lorillard Tobacco Company
Pierre Lorillard II (1764-1843), American tobacco manufacturer, son of Pierre Abraham Lorillard
Dorothea Anne Lorillard (1798–1866), daughter of Pierre Lorillard II and wife of John David Wolfe (1792–1872), a real estate developer
Catharine Lorillard Wolfe (1828–1887), philanthropist and granddaughter of Pierre Lorillard III
Pierre Lorillard III (1796-1867), American country club developer, grandson of Pierre Abraham Lorillard, son of Pierre Lorillard II
Catherine Lorillard Kernochan (1835–1917), daughter of Pierre Lorillard III
Eva Lorillard Kip (1847–1903)]], daughter of Pierre Lorillard III
George L. Lorillard (1843-1892), American tobacco manufacturer, son of Pierre Lorillard III
Louis Lasher Lorillard (1849–1910), brother-in law of Rhode Island Governor Robert Livingston Beeckman, son of Pierre Lorillard III
Mary Lorillard Barbey (1841–1926), daughter of Pierre Lorillard III
Pierre Lorillard IV (1833-1901), American tobacco manufacturer, great-grandson of Pierre Abraham Lorillard, son of Pierre Lorillard III
 Nathaniel Griswold Lorillard (1862–1888)
Pierre Lorillard V (1860–1940), son-in-law of James Jerome Hill and son or Pierre Lorillard IV
 Lorillard S. Spencer, great-grandson of Pierre Lorillard II

Brands and enterprises
 Lorillard Snuff Mill, the oldest existing tobacco manufacturing building in the United States
 Lorillard Tobacco Company, an American tobacco company